Albert Rocas Comas (born 16 June 1982) is a Spanish handball player. He is currently retired and is working in a Spanish school. 

He participated at the 2008 Summer Olympics in Beijing as a member of the Spain men's national handball team. The team won a bronze medal, defeating Croatia. He was included as "Best right wing" in that tournament's All Star Team. At the 2013 World Men's Handball Championship, the national team became world champion for the second time.

References

External links
 

1982 births
Living people
Spanish male handball players
Handball players at the 2008 Summer Olympics
Handball players at the 2012 Summer Olympics
Olympic handball players of Spain
Olympic bronze medalists for Spain
Liga ASOBAL players
BM Valladolid players
SDC San Antonio players
FC Barcelona Handbol players
Olympic medalists in handball
Handball players from Catalonia
Medalists at the 2008 Summer Olympics
Mediterranean Games gold medalists for Spain
Competitors at the 2005 Mediterranean Games
BM Granollers players
Mediterranean Games medalists in handball
21st-century Spanish people